Corruption is rare in the Netherlands  in all major areas—judiciary, police, business, politics—as the country is considered one of the least corrupt within the European Union.

Extent
The National Integrity System Assessment 2012, published by Transparency International Netherlands, reports that the country has established strong pillars—an independent judiciary, effective anti-corruption mechanisms and a culture of trust—that all combine to create a society where corruption is not considered a serious problem. The government has dedicated large efforts towards keeping corruption within the country at low levels, yet limitations are perceived in some areas. The public sector is not perceived to be corrupt and transparency within the sector is safeguarded by codes of conducts for civil servants, with a special focus on integrity within their sectors, according to the National Integrity System Assessment 2012.

Business 
Executives surveyed in the World Economic Forum's Global Competitiveness Report 2013–2014 do not perceive corruption a problem to doing business. The Netherlands is a global leader in the area of Corporate Social Responsibility (CSR), and that most companies operating in the Netherlands have established a code of conduct as well as internal mechanisms to detect and prevent bribery. 

According to Eurobarometer 2012, connections between business and politics are the most cited reason behind corruption and almost one-third of surveyed citizens share this perception. This is supported by the National Integrity System Assessment 2012, which notes that collusion between businesses and public authorities is especially prevalent in the public procurement sector. This sector is sensitive to irregularities and the report recommends the government to strengthen regulations and supervision of public procurements.

Government 

On Transparency International's 2021 Corruption Perceptions Index, the Netherlands scored 82 on a scale from 0 ("highly corrupt") to 100 ("highly clean"). When ranked by score, the Netherlands ranked 8th among the 180 countries in the Index, where the country ranked first is perceived to have the most honest public sector.  For comparison, the best score was 88 (ranked 1), and the worst score was 11 (ranked 180).

References

External links
The Netherlands Corruption Profile from the Business Anti-Corruption Portal.

Netherlands
Politics of the Netherlands
Crime in the Netherlands by type
Society of the Netherlands